The Alan Turvey Trophy, formerly the Isthmian League Cup is a football knock-out cup competition organised by the Isthmian League in England.

History
Isthmian League Chairman and President Alan Turvey was among the FA's "150 Grassroots Heroes" who were presented in 2013, during the 150-year celebrations of the Football Association, with a specially minted medal by Prince William. In June 2015, Turvey stepped down from the League after nearly 60 years involvement  with football. The Isthmian League cup was renamed in his honour.

Winners

1974–75: Tilbury
1975–76: Slough Town
1976–77: Hendon
1977–78: Dagenham
1978–79: Enfield
1979–80: Enfield
1980–81: Slough Town
1981–82: Leytonstone-Ilford
1982–83: Sutton United
1983–84: Sutton United
1984–85: Wycombe Wanderers
1985–86: Sutton United
1986–87: Bognor Regis Town
1987–88: Yeovil Town
1988–89: Bishop's Stortford
1989–90: Aveley
1990–91: Woking
1991–92: Grays Athletic
1992–93: Marlow
1993–94: Chertsey Town
1994–95: Aylesbury United
1995–96: Kingstonian
1996–97: Boreham Wood
1997–98: Sutton United
1998–99: Aldershot Town
1999–00: Farnborough Town
2000–01: Heybridge Swifts
2001–02: Northwood
2002–03: Yeading
2003–04: Thurrock
2004–05: Slough Town
2005–06: Fisher Athletic
2006–07: Ashford Town
2007–08: Ramsgate
2008–09: Tilbury
2009–10: Leatherhead
2010–11: Wingate & Finchley
2011–12: Bury Town
2012–13: Concord Rangers
2013–14: Maidstone United
2014–15: Hendon
2015–16: Kingstonian
2016–17: Billericay Town
2017–18: Billericay Town 
2018–19: Enfield Town
2019-20: No Winner.  Competition abandoned due to the government's response to the COVID 19 pandemic
2020-21: No Competition due to Government's response to COVID 19 pandemic
2021-22: Horsham

References

External links
 "The snobbery and inverse snobbery of supporting a non-league club" by Mike Bayly for When Saturday Comes, in The Guardian, 6 September 2013

Isthmian League
Recurring sporting events established in 1975
Football cup competitions in England